Farrokh Shahr (formerly, Ghahfarokh, Ghahfarrokh, Qahfarokh, and Qahfarrokh) is a city in Farrokhshahr District of Shahrekord County, Chaharmahal and Bakhtiari province, Iran, located  from the provincial capital, Shahrekord. At the 2006 census, its population was 28,920 in 7,532 households. The following census in 2011 counted 30,036 people in 8,266 households. The latest census in 2016 showed a population of 31,739 people in 9,292 households. The city is populated by Persians with a Luri minority.

References 

Shahrekord County

Cities in Chaharmahal and Bakhtiari Province

Populated places in Chaharmahal and Bakhtiari Province

Populated places in Shahr-e Kord County

Luri settlements in Chaharmahal and Bakhtiari Province